The 2000 Trans America Athletic Conference baseball tournament was held at John Sessions Stadium at Alexander Brest Field on the campus of Jacksonville University in Jacksonville, Florida, from May 17 through 20.  won its fourth tournament championship to earn the Trans America Athletic Conference's automatic bid to the 2000 NCAA Division I baseball tournament.

Seeding
The top six teams (based on conference results) from the conference earn invites to the tournament.

Results

All-Tournament Team
The following players were named to the All-Tournament Team.

Tournament Most Valuable Player
Jeff Christy was named Tournament Most Valuable Player.  Christy was an outfielder for Stetson.

References

Tournament
ASUN Conference Baseball Tournament
Trans America Athletic baseball tournament
Trans America Athletic Conference baseball tournament